Maria Elisabeth Hille (1827–1893), was a Dutch photographer.  She was the first professional female photographer in the Netherlands.

She managed a studio where she worked alongside her spouse in Groningen in 1853 (from 1857 in The Hague). She took over the business formally when she was widowed in 1863.

References

External links 
Maria Hille biography at Photolexicon, Depth of field.

19th-century Dutch photographers
19th-century Dutch businesspeople
Dutch women photographers
1827 births
1893 deaths
19th-century women photographers